"Maroon" is a song by American singer-songwriter Taylor Swift, taken from her tenth studio album, Midnights (2022). Written and produced by Swift and Jack Antonoff, it is a dream pop and synth-pop ballad with layered vocals, trap beats, and an oscillating electric guitar creating a sustained note throughout. In the lyrics, the narrator reminisces about a past relationship's memories.

The track received generally positive reviews from music critics, who complimented the production and deemed the lyrics poetic, but a few found the theme similar to Swift's previous songs. "Maroon" peaked at number four on the Billboard Global 200, number three on the US Billboard Hot 100, and charted within the top ten in Australia, Canada, Malaysia, New Zealand, and the Philippines.

Background and release 
American singer-songwriter Taylor Swift announced her tenth studio album at the 2022 MTV Video Music Awards on August 28, 2022. She later revealed the name of the album, Midnights, and its album cover on social networks but the tracklist was not immediately revealed. On a video via her Instagram account on September 6, 2022, titled "The making of Midnights", Swift revealed that Jack Antonoff, who had worked with her before on her five studio albums since 1989 (2014), was a producer on the album. Starting from September 21, 2022, exactly a month before Midnights's release, she announced a thirteen-episode short series called Midnights Mayhem with Me on the social media platform TikTok. The series' purpose is to announce a song title every episode by rolling a lottery cage containing thirteen ping pong balls numbered one to thirteen, each ball representing a track. In episode five on September 30, 2022, Swift revealed "Maroon" as the title of track two. The song alongside the thirteen announced tracks and additional surprise-released tracks for the 3am edition of Midnights, was released on October 21 under Republic Records.

Composition and lyrics 

"Maroon" is three minutes and thirty-eight seconds long. The song is a dream pop and synth-pop ballad with elements of trip hop. It has a buzzing electronic drone that dominates the second half. The production incorporates layered, reverbed vocals, synthesizers, preset echoing drum patterns, trap beats, and electric guitar played on an EBow creating a single note that sustains and slowly oscillates up and down throughout the track. Critics described the track's production as ambient, moody, and atmospheric. Alexis Petridis of The Guardian described the guitar as "shoegazey". In Paste, Ellen Johnson compared the trap-tinged production and "light rapping" on "Maroon" to the music of "Dress", a track off Swift's 2017 album Reputation.

In the lyrics, the narrator reminisces a past relationship where she and the lover shared memories together, referencing many imagery found in Swift's older songs such as New York, wine, and scenes of domestic life. The refrain recalls the remnants of a neglected long-distance relationship ("And how the blood rushed into my cheeks/ So scarlet, it was (Maroon)/ The mark they saw on my collarbone/ The rust that grew between telephones"). After detailing how the relationship derails in the second verse, the narrator then contemplates on how the relationship still leaves a mark on her in the bridge ("And I wake with your memory over me/ That's a real fucking legacy, legacy").

Some reviewers noted a probable reference to Swift's 2012 album Red as both titles refer to shades of red. Quinn Moreland from Pitchfork wrote that whereas the lyrics are intensely personal, the production makes it "oddly impersonal, bordering on numb". John Wohlmacher of Beats Per Minute wrote that in addition to Red, "Maroon" references many of Swift's past songs, such as the "flushed cheeks" of "Illicit Affairs" (2020). He added that the New York reference in the lyrics represents "a secret affair and emotionally crushing loss", harkening back to tracks such as "Cornelia Street" (2019) and "Hoax" (2020). Ann Powers from NPR, sharing the same idea, commented that "Maroon" is a sequence to "Cornelia Street", a track about a haunting romance set in New York.

Critical reception 
Courteney Larossa and Callie Ahlgrim from Insider hailed "Maroon" as a standout track from Midnights; Lacrossa called the song a "brilliant" play on Swift's color theory about love while Ahlgrim stated that it was a "shimmering" nostalgic rush of her past songs. Wohlmacher hailed it as an "immediate masterpiece" and "the pop song of the year", praising the production and lyrics. In Esquire, Alex Bilmes lauded the track with "a killer vocal and lyrics worthy of a Ryan Murphy soap opera". Billboard journalist Jason Lipshutz complimented Swift's songwriting in the song, saying that "their impact hasn't dulled one bit". Pop-culture writer Kenneth Partridge, in an article for Genius, found "Maroon" contained some of the most poetic lyrics Swift had written. Moreland said that of all Midnights track, "['Maroon'] may be the one that keeps me awake at night". Petridis opined the track "superb" and deemed it a representation of the album's subdued, atmospheric production, and Paul Bridgewater of The Line of Best Fit remarked that it is one of the best album tracks sonically.

On a less complimentary side, Jon Caramanica of The New York Times was not impressed by the production, saying that Swift's vocals are "stacked together to the point of suffocation". Similarly, Paul Attard from Slant Magazine found the production somewhat redundant. In Slate, Carl Wilson considered "Maroon" a decent song on its own but, in the context of Midnights, makes the entire album drag, relying on many familiar tropes of Swift's songwriting that feel "a bit generic and fan-servicey". Exclaim!'''s Megan LaPierre appreciated the first verse and the bridge but found the rest of the song "stumbles in comparison."
 Commercial performance 
Upon the release of Midnights, "Maroon" debuted at number three on the US Billboard Hot 100; its first-week figures included 37.6 million streams, 2,900 downloads, and 471,000 airplay impressions. Swift became the first act to concurrently occupy the top-10 of the Hot 100 and the woman with the most top-100 entries (40), surpassing Madonna (38). In Canada, it peaked at number four on the Canadian Hot 100 and was certified platinum by Music Canada on January 19, 2022. "Maroon" appeared in national record charts worldwide, at number four in Australia and the Philippines, number five in Malaysia and New Zealand, number 11 in Portugal and Vietnam, number 12 in Iceland and South Africa, number 19 in Croatia, number 20 in Luxembourg, number 22 in Hong Kong, number 26 in Sweden, number 30 in Norway, number 32 in Denmark, number 49 in Spain, number 96 in Germany, and number 100 of Argentina and France. The song ultimately peaked at number four on the Billboard Global 200.

 Credits and personnel 
Credits are adapted from the liner notes of Midnights''.
Recording
 Recorded at Rough Customer Studio, Brooklyn and Electric Lady Studios, New York City
 Mixed at MixStar Studios, Virginia Beach
 Mastered at Sterling Sound, Edgewater, New Jersey
 Evan Smith's performance was recorded by herself at Pleasure Hill Recording, Portland, Maine

Personnel
 Taylor Swift – vocals, songwriting, production
 Jack Antonoff – songwriting, production, engineering, programming, percussion, Juno 6, modular synth, piano, electric guitars, bass, recording
 Evan Smith – engineering, organ, saxophone, flute, clarinet, recording
 Laura Sisk – engineering, recording
 Megan Searl – assistant engineering
 John Sher – assistant engineering
 John Rooney – assistant engineering
 Serban Ghenea – mixing
 Bryce Bordone – assistant mixing
 Randy Merrill – mastering

Charts

Certifications

References 

2022 songs
2020s ballads
Taylor Swift songs
Songs written by Taylor Swift
Songs written by Jack Antonoff
Song recordings produced by Taylor Swift
Song recordings produced by Jack Antonoff
Dream pop songs
American synth-pop songs
Synth-pop ballads